People Like Me may refer to:

 People Like Me (album), or the title song, by Alyth, 2009
 People Like Me, an album by Rhett Akins, 2007
 "People Like Me", a song by Audio Adrenaline from Some Kind of Zombie, 1997
 "People Like Me" (song), by Hanoi Rocks, 2002
 "Peolpe Like Me", a song by K'naan from Troubadour, 2009